Mark Jeffrey Wilson (born August 1980) is an Australian musician, originally from Geelong. From 2002 to 2012, and since their 2017 comeback, he has played bass guitar for the Melbourne-based rock band, Jet. He was asked to join them by three founding members, Nic Cester, Chris Cester and Cameron Muncey, but initially refused out of loyalty to his then-current group, The CA$inos. Days later he rang up Muncey and the Cesters and agreed to join their group instead.

Wilson plays a vintage Fender Precision Bass, in either sunburst or white. He also can be seen playing an Epiphone Jack Casady signature bass in the Are You Gonna Be My Girl video. He always plays with a pick. Wilson also plays piano on some tracks ("Look What You've Done", "Seventeen", "She Holds a Grudge"),  and occasional percussion, samples, synthesizer, and harmonica. He sometimes provides backing vocals ("Rollover DJ", "Beat on Repeat", "Times Like This") He co-wrote "Start the Show" with guitarist, Muncey. On 24 October 2007 Chris Cester and Wilson co-wrote and, under the name, The Vice Lords, produced a song, "I Spy I Spy", for the Japanese former duo, Superfly.

In 2011 Wilson and Chris Cester formed a side project, DamnDogs as a "doom-disco" band, with Louis Macklin on keyboards (touring member of Jet), and Mitch McIvor (Cester's cousin) on guitar. On 9 August they issued a five-track extended play, Strange Behaviour. In March 2012, Jet disbanded and Wilson had left DamnDogs.

In 2016, Wilson returned to playing music, playing bass in Peter Garrett's backing band, The Alter Egos. Months later, it was announced that Jet would be reuniting in 2017 to open for Bruce Springsteen on his Australian tour.

Instruments and equipment

Electric bass
 Fender Precision
 Epiphone Jack Casady

Acoustic bass
 Takamine Acoustic Bass

Amplifiers/heads
 Ampeg SVT Classic Amp Head
 Ampeg SVT810 Bass Box
 Fender TB-1200 Head
 Fender Pro Series Bass Amps

References

General
 
  Note: [on-line] version established at White Room Electronic Publishing Pty Ltd in 2007 and was expanded from the 2002 edition.

Specific

1980 births
Australian rock bass guitarists
Male bass guitarists
Living people
Jet (band) members
21st-century bass guitarists
21st-century Australian male musicians
21st-century Australian musicians
Australian male guitarists
Musicians from Geelong